Bangladesh Civil Service, more popularly known by its acronym BCS, is the civil service of Bangladesh. Civil service in the Indian subcontinent originated from the Imperial Civil Service which was the elite higher civil service of the British Empire in India during British rule in the period between 1858 and 1947. After the partition of 1947, East Bengal became a province of Pakistan, so it was Central Superior Services of Pakistan which later after the independence of Bangladesh in 1971 became known as Bangladesh Civil Service.

Bangladesh Public Service Commission (BPSC) is the main policy setting and recruitment body of BCS. BCS has 26 cadres. In the parliamentary democracy of Bangladesh, the ultimate responsibility for running the administration rests with the elected representatives of the people which are the ministers. But the handful of ministers cannot be expected to deal personally with the manifold problems of modern administration. Thus the ministers lay down the policy and civil servants carry out this policy.

History
The civil bureaucracy is a colonial legacy in this part of the world. The British used to rule the native population through Indian Civil Service (ICS) and most of the officers in ICS were British themselves. It was in the early 20th century that the Indians also started competing against the British and many Indians eventually made it to the ICS. With the partition of India in 1947, the term Central Superior Services was used in Pakistan and the concept of All-Pakistan Services continued. After the independence of Bangladesh in 1971, Bangladesh Civil Service is formed to gear up the government system of the newly born country by an act from the then President Sheikh Mujibur Rahman.

Formation of the Commission
Bangladesh Public Service Commission a constitutional body established primarily  recruit persons for various services and posts in the government. It is also involved in decision processes relating to other service matters such as promotion, posting, transfer, discipline, and appeal of the government servants. The main purpose of constituting such a body, designated in most countries of British heritage as 'civil' or 'public' service commission, is to ensure that all decisions relating to recruitment and other service matters are made consistent with the principles of merit and equity. In Bangladesh, this body is presently designated as the Bangladesh Public Service Commission (BPSC).
A commission called Public Service Commission was first established in India in 1926, when it was entrusted with functions almost similar to those of its British counterpart in London, particularly in matters of recruitment of public servants of the central government of British India. Similar provincial level commissions were subsequently established, including the Bengal Public Service Commission in 1937, following the formation of responsible governments in the provinces in pursuance of provisions made in the Government of India Act, 1919, and thereafter in the Government of India Act, 1935. After the partition of India in 1947, replicas of the Public Service Commission in British India were created in Pakistan, both at central and provincial levels. Hence a body designated as Public Service Commission, Eastern Pakistan (renamed later East Pakistan Public Service Commission) came into being in East Bengal (later named East Pakistan) in August 1947.
After the emergence of Bangladesh two separate commissions, namely the Public Service Commission (First), and the Public Service Commission (Second), were initially established in May 1972 under provisions made in President's Order No. 34 of 1972. But to give effect to the provisions on public service commissions in the constitution adopted in November 1972, a fresh Presidential Order (President's Order No. 25 of 1973) was promulgated in March 1973 which in effect formally regularized the establishment of the two commissions in existence since May 1972. However, in November 1977 the government promulgated another ordinance to establish a single commission in place of the existing two commissions, which, in effect, came into being on 22 December 1977 and was designated as Bangladesh Public Service Commission.

Constitutional structure
The Constitution of Bangladesh provides the fundamental law to construct The Bangladesh Public Service Commission (BPSC), a quasi judicial body that works under the provisions of the Article 137 – 141 of the Constitution of Bangladesh and certain other rules and regulations made by the government from time to time.
Bangladeshi Nationals are recruited through the provisions of the constitution from article 133 to 136 and article 29.

Governance

Head

The highest ranking civil servant is the Chief of the Cabinet Secretariat of the People's Republic of Bangladesh who is also the Cabinet Secretary. He is ex-officio Chairman of the Superior Selection Board and head of all civil services under the rules of business of the Government of Bangladesh. He also holds the 12th position in the Warrant of Precedence of Bangladesh.
Cabinet Secretary is appointed from Bangladesh Civil Service (Administration) Cadre, known as Bangladesh Administrative Service.

   
      
 Present Cabinet Secretary of the Republic is Mr. Khandker Anwarul Islam. He is the 22nd Cabinet Secretary to the government of Bangladesh.

The position holder is accountable for ensuring that the Civil Service is equipped with the skills and capability to meet the everyday challenges it faces and that civil servants work in a fair and decent environment.

Cadre compositions
Existing Cadres: 26
General Cadres: 10
Professional Cadres: 12
Cadres with Both General & Professional Posts: 4

Cadres no longer exist: 4
Abolished Cadres: 2 (Judicial in 2007, Telecommunications in 2008)
Cadres Merged into Administration Cadre: 2 (Secretariat in 1992, Economic in 2018)

There are two types of cadres in Bangladesh Civil Service: General Cadres and Professional/Technical Cadres.

General cadres
BCS (Foreign Affairs)
BCS (Administration)
BCS (Police)
BCS (Audit & Accounts) 
BCS (Taxation)
BCS (Customs & Excise)
BCS (Ansar)
BCS (Family Planning)
BCS (Postal)
BCS (Railway Transportation & Commercial)

Professional cadres
BCS (General Education)
BCS (Technical Education)
BCS (Public Health Engineering)
BCS (Public Works)
BCS (Railway: Engineering)
BCS (Roads & Highways)
BCS (Health)
BCS (Agriculture)
BCS (Forest)
BCS (Fisheries)
BCS (Livestock)
BCS (Statistics)

Cadres with both general and professional posts
 BCS (Food)
 BCS (Trade)
 BCS (Information)
 BCS (Co-operative)

 A substantive changes happened recently: The Government of the People's Republic of Bangladesh with Gazette Notification no. SRO No. 355 Act/2018, 13 November 2018 has merged two cadres of the civil administration-Administration and Economic (Bangladesh Gazette, 13 November 2018, Govt. of the People's Republic of Bangladesh). Now, all positions and manpower of the Economic cadre will belong to that of the Administration cadre. The said reformation has happened to ensure a more dynamic, coordinated and people-friendly administrative system.

Examination system
BCS Examination is the top most competitive job examination in Bangladesh. On an average, 350,000 to 425,000 candidates apply every year and the percentage of candidates appearing is more than 90%. Aspirants must complete a three-stage process, with a final success rate of about 2% for all cadres and 0.5% for general cadres, although it varies from years to years exam.

See also
 Executive Magistrate of Bangladesh

References

Government of Bangladesh
Civil service in Bangladesh
Public Administration of Bangladesh